"Valerik" is a war poem published in 1843 by the Russian Romantic writer Mikhail Lermontov.

The battle

The Battle of the Valerik River was fought on July 11, 1840, between the Imperial Russian Army and Chechen and Ingush mountain tribesmen, as part of the Russian conquest of the Caucasus.

Mikhail Lermontov, a lieutenant in the Tenginsky Regiment, showed exemplary valor in the battle. Eyewitness accounts describe him astride a white horse, leading his men into battle with reckless abandon. The official battle report stated:

For this, Lermontov was awarded the Order of St. Vladimir Fourth Class, but he never received the award as his name was removed from the final list of recipients by Czar Nicholas I, who harbored a strong dislike for the contumacious poet.

The poem

After the battle, Lermontov struggled to find a way to express his experience. His own feelings about combat were mixed - he wrote in a letter that he had developed "a taste for war" as a gamble with death and with breezy sarcasm described "the ravine where this fun took place", but the poem he wrote ultimately viewed war as a senseless slaughter, and he and the fighters (on both sides) as "beasts" violating the beautiful world of his beloved pristine Caucasus

Although the poem contains battle scenes both stirring and grisly (which correlate in great detail to the official action report), it ends on a pensive note as the protagonist sits on a drum after the battle:

"Valerik" was first published (with omissions) posthumously  in 1843 in the anthology Dawn.

References

Further reading
 An analysis of "Valerik" is found in

External links
Valerik poem (not full) reading (video)
Text of Lermontov's poem Valerik 
Brief description and analysis of Lermontov's poem Valerik 

Poetry by Mikhail Lermontov
1843 poems